Rose Thomas or Rosie Thomas may refer to:

People
Rosie Thomas (writer) (born 1947), pen name of Welsh romance novelist
Rosie Thomas (singer-songwriter) American comedian performing since 1990s
Rose Thomas (rugby union) (born 1988), French rugby sevens 2016 Olympian
Rose Thomas (field hockey) (born 1992), Welsh goalkeeper, also for Great Britain

Fictional characters 
Rosé Thomas, a Fullmetal Alchemist character

See also
Rosemary Thomas (1901–1961), American poet and teacher
Rosa Graham Thomas, award-winning British shrub named in 1983 for horticulturalist Graham Thomas